Howard, also known as Howard Mines or Stovalls Gap, is an unincorporated community in Fayette County, Alabama, United States.

History
The community is possibly named after the original owner of the surrounding land or for the head of the local coal-mining operation. A post office operated under the name Stovalls Gap from 1926 to 1927 and under the name Howard from 1927 to 1942. Moss & McCormack, a coal company based in Birmingham, leased the area in 1923 to open a coal mine. A miner from Kansas, Alabama died in a mining accident at the Howard Mine in 1935.

References

Unincorporated communities in Fayette County, Alabama
Unincorporated communities in Alabama